Anadenanthera is a genus of South American trees in the Legume family, Fabaceae. The genus contains two to four species, including A. colubrina and A. peregrina. These trees respectively are known to the western world primarily as sources of the hallucinogenic snuffs vilca/cebil and yopo/cohoba.

The main active constituent of Anadenanthera is bufotenin.

Species
Anadenanthera colubrina
Anadenanthera colubrina var. cebil
Anadenanthera colubrina var. colubrina
Anadenanthera peregrina
Anadenanthera peregrina var. falcata
Anadenanthera peregrina var. peregrina

Chemical compounds
Chemical compounds contained in Anadenanthera include:

5-Methoxy-N,N-dimethyltryptamine, bark
Serotonin 
N-Methyl-serotonin			
5-Methoxy-N-methyltryptamine, bark 	 		
Bufotenin,	seeds, bark	
Bufotenine N-oxide, seeds 			
N,N-Dimethyltryptamine, seeds, pods, bark		
N,N-Dimethyltryptamine-N-oxide, Seeds			
N-Methyltryptamine, bark
2-Methyl-6-methoxy-1,2,3-tetrahydro-9H-pyrido[3,4-b]indole
2-Methyl-1,2,3,4-tetrahydro-9H-pyrido[3,4-b]indole
1,2-Dimethyl-6-methoxy-1,2,3,4-tetrahydro-9H-pyrido[3,4-b]indole

References

Notes

General references
Constantino Torres - Anadenanthera: Visionary Plant of South America (2006) 
Jonathan Ott - Shamanic Snuffs or Entheogenic Errhines (2001) 
Richard Evans Schultes - Plants of the Gods (1992) 
Patricia J. Knobloch - Wari Ritual Power at Conchopata: An Interpretation of Anadenanthera Colubrina Iconography. Latin American Antiquity 11(4), 2000, pp. 387–402.
https://web.archive.org/web/20060904021306/http://leda.lycaeum.org/?ID=78
Juan P. Ogalde, Bernardo T. Arriaza, and Elia C. Soto - Uso de plantas psicoactivas en el north de Chile: evidencia química del consumo de ayahuasca durante el periodo medio (500-1000 d.C.). Latin American Antiquity 21(4), 2010, pp 441–450.

External links
  Society of Ethnobotanical Studies and Modified States of Consciousness
 Who Was Who in the Andean Middle Horizon Prehistory: Plant Identification
 Anadenanthera: Visionary Plant of Ancient South America

 
Neotropical realm flora
Psychedelic tryptamine carriers
Entheogens
Herbal and fungal hallucinogens
Taxa named by Carlo Luigi Spegazzini
Fabaceae genera